Histiovalva is a genus of moths belonging to the family Tineidae. It contains only one species, Histiovalva fortunata, which is found in Guinea.

References

Myrmecozelinae
Monotypic moth genera
Lepidoptera of West Africa
Moths of Africa